II – The Final Option is an album by the German band Die Krupps. It was released in 1993. A double CD special edition was released the same year, containing the same track listing with demo versions on the second CD.

Track listing

Personnel 
 Jürgen Engler – vocals, keyboards, samplers
 Lee Altus – guitar
 Rüdiger Esch – bass guitar
 Darren Minter – drums
 Ralf Dörper – keyboards, samples

Chart positions

References 

1993 albums
Die Krupps albums
Rough Trade Records albums